The Washington Irving Graded School (Spanish: Escuela Washington Irving) is a historic school located in Adjuntas Pueblo, the historic and administrative center of the municipality of Adjuntas in central Puerto Rico. The school was added to the National Register of Historic Places in 2015 due to its historic architectural importance.

The 1903 school is a one-story, four-classroom, C-shaped, brick and masonry, Neoclassical flat-with-parapet-concrete-roofed building located one block southeast from the main town square of Adjuntas. This is the oldest school building in Adjuntas and one of the oldest school buildings in Puerto Rico, in addition to being one of the educational institutions built under the United States administration in the island.

See also 
 National Register of Historic Places listings in Adjuntas, Puerto Rico

References 

School buildings on the National Register of Historic Places in Puerto Rico
School buildings completed in 1903
1903 establishments in Puerto Rico
Adjuntas, Puerto Rico
Late 19th and Early 20th Century American Movements architecture